Palma School is a grade 6-12 Catholic boys school located in Salinas, California, United States. Located in the Roman Catholic Diocese of Monterey, its motto is "Palma Merenti," which translates in English as "Palms to the Victor."

History

Palma School was founded in 1951 through the efforts of Monsignor Thomas J. Earley and dedicated laymen, among them the late Joseph Piini and the late Lloyd Stolich. Their collective dream of Catholic secondary education was realized in September, 1951 when Palma opened its doors to boys and girls as a co-institutional school. The boys were instructed and have continued to be instructed by the Congregation of Christian Brothers. The Christian Brothers, known internationally as Catholic educators, were founded in 1802 by Brother Edmund Ignatius Rice who was beatified in Rome on October 6, 1996; his feast day has been set as May 5. His goal was to give the youth of his time a unique Christian education. Palma continued to be operated as a co-institutional school for thirteen years when, in 1964, a separate facility for girls was opened a few blocks away. At that time, Palma became an all-boys school and the Christian Brothers assumed administration of the entire facility. 
A chapel was built in the front of the school in 2003.  It has been named the Brother Edmund Rice Chapel.  It is used by the students and staff to enhance the religious education program at Palma School.

Palma is located one block away from its sister school, Notre Dame High School, a Catholic all-girls school.

Sports

The football and basketball programs have won state titles. The football, basketball and cross country teams have won NorCal and/or section championships. The golf program has been on the rise, garnering a fourth-place finish in the 2008 CIF State Championship.

Football Championships
CAA: 1959, 1961,1962, 1963, 1965
MTAL: 1970, 1984, 1985, 1986, 1987, 1988, 1989, 1990, 1991, 1992, 1993, 1994, 1995, 1996, 1997
MBL: 1998, 1999, 2000, 2001, 2012, 2013, 2014, 2015, 2016
T-CAL: 2003, 2004, 2005, 2006, 2008, 2009, 2010
Pacific Coast-Gabilan: 2018, 2022
Central Coast Section: 1989, 1990, 1991, 1992, 1993, 1997, 1998, 2000, 2001, 2003, 2011
State, D-III: 1992

Basketball Championships
CAA: 1964, 1967
MTAL: 1968, 1970, 1971, 1972, 1973, 1974, 1984, 1985, 1988, 1991, 1992, 1997, 1998
MBL: 1986, 1987, 2000, 2015, 2016, 2017
T-CAL: 2007, 2008, 2009, 2010, 2012
Pacific Coast-Gabilan: 2020
Central Coast Section: 1988, 1992, 1993, 1997, 1999, 2000, 2007
Central Coast Section, Region IV: 1974
NorCal: 1992, 1993, 2016
State: 1992

Notable alumni

Wells Adams—Class of 2002, television and radio host and personality; ABC’s The Bachelorette (American season 12) and Bachelor in Paradise (American season 3); married to actress Sarah Hyland
Jonathan Bomarito—Class of 2000, professional race car driver
Chris Dalman—Class of 1988, Stanford University; NFL — offensive lineman for the San Francisco 49ers (Super Bowl  XXIX) 1993–1999; assistant offensive line coach for the Atlanta Falcons 2005–2006; offensive line coach for the Stanford Cardinal; President of Palma School
Drew Dalman-Class of 2017, NFL player for the Atlanta Falcons
David Esquer—Class of 1983, Stanford University, head baseball coach for the Cal Bears 2000–2017; Pacific-10 Conference coach of the year (2001); head baseball coach of the Stanford Cardinal baseball team (2018–present)
David Fales—Class of 2009, San Jose State University; NFL quarterback — Chicago Bears (2014–2016), Miami Dolphins (2017–2018) New York Jets (2019–2020)
Tom Fanoe—Class of 1964, MBA from Haas School of Business at the University of California, Berkeley; past president of Levi Strauss & Co.’s Levi’s USA and president of Joe Boxer
Michael Gasperson—Class of 2000, University of San Diego; NFL — wide receiver for the Philadelphia Eagles (2006–2007)
Orlando Johnson—Class of 2007, UC Santa Barbara; NBA — Indiana Pacers (2012–2014), Sacramento Kings (2014), Austin Spurs (2014–2015, 2017), also played overseas
Peter Lauritson—Class of 1970, film and television producer and director, notably of the Star Trek franchise
Brian Reader—Arena Football League quarterback, director of football operations at the University of Idaho
Michael Rianda—Class of 2002, writer and director with Sony Pictures Animation.
E.J. Rowland—pro basketball player, Bulgarian national team
Elliot Vallejo—Class of 2002, signed as an undrafted free agent by the Arizona Cardinals; retired from NFL in 2010
Jamaree Bouyea—Class of 2017, University of San Francisco; NBA — Miami Heat (2023), Washington Wizards (2023—)

See also
Edmund Ignatius Rice

Notes and references

External links
Palma School

High schools in Monterey County, California
Congregation of Christian Brothers secondary schools
Catholic secondary schools in California
Roman Catholic Diocese of Monterey in California
Education in Salinas, California
Educational institutions established in 1951
Boys' schools in the United States
Buildings and structures in Salinas, California
1951 establishments in California